Asim Iqbal (born 16 July 1977) is a Pakistani first-class cricketer who played for Rawalpindi cricket team.

References

External links
 

1977 births
Living people
Pakistani cricketers
Rawalpindi cricketers
Cricketers from Gujrat